Troy Winbush (born March 12, 1970) is an American actor best known for his recurring role as Denny on The Cosby Show.

Early life
Winbush was born in Manhattan, New York to Betty Winbush. He is also the younger brother of Alicia Winbush.

Career 
He is best known for his recurring role as Denny on The Cosby Show, appearing on the series from 1987 to 1991. He also made guest appearances in other notable television series including Tremors, Law & Order, NYPD Blue, Boston Public, CSI: Miami, JAG, Monk, Touched by an Angel, The Parkers, and the short-lived NBC drama, Medical Investigation.

He co-starred in the feature films The Replacements (2000), John Q (2002), The Last Shot (2004), and Backwoods (2008). He also played Travis Harris in Tyler Perry's House of Payne.

Troy played the role of “baby” Emile in the 1987 movie The Principal starring James Belushi. 
 
Winbush made an appearance in The Big Bang Theory episode "The Proton Resurgence".

Personal life 
Winbush is married to Monica Dozier and has two children.

Filmography

Film and TV Movies

Television

Video Game

References

External links
 

1970 births
Living people
20th-century American male actors
21st-century American male actors
Male actors from New York City
African-American male actors
American male film actors
American male television actors
People from Manhattan
20th-century African-American people
21st-century African-American people